Bradford is a district of east Manchester, England, two miles north east of the city centre. The population at the 2011 census was 15,784. Historically in Lancashire, after the closure of its heavy industries Bradford was for many years an economically deprived area but has undergone regeneration with the building of the City of Manchester Stadium which hosted the 2002 Commonwealth Games and is now home to Manchester City F.C. Bradford is neighboured by Beswick to the south and the two areas are sometimes referred to as Bradford-with-Beswick. The River Medlock and the Ashton Canal run through Bradford.

History
The name of the area is ancient and in 1196 the village was recorded as Bradeford, meaning  the broad ford. Up to the Industrial Revolution, it was rural with woodland, pastures and brooks. Wolves and eagles once inhabited the woodlands and honey production was part of the local economy.

Coal mining
From Tudor times (1485–1603), sufficient coal was mined to supply most of the needs of Manchester and with the onset of the Industrial Revolution, Bradford Colliery provided fuel to power steam engines in the new cotton mills that were springing up in the district. With the coming of the Ashton Canal in 1797, the colliery was connected to it by means of a private branch.

In 1871, the owner of Bradford Colliery was R. T. Parker and the occupier, for rate purposes, was T. & C. Livesey. When deeper pit shafts were sunk, seams of fireclay were discovered and consequently a brickworks was built on the north side of the colliery site to manufacture firebricks for use in lining furnaces. In 1896, the pit manager was F. L. Ward and the under-manager was George Bentley. At that time there were 404 underground workers and 125 surface workers. Coal were mined for making gas, for household and manufacturing use and for raising steam. The brickworks was operational in 1896  owned by Edward Williams. It employed three underground workers extracting clay and two surface workers. In 1935 Bradford Colliery became part of Manchester Collieries and became part of the National Coal Board on nationalisation in 1947. It remained open until September 1968 when it closed, not because its supply of coal was exhausted, but because of the damage to property caused by subsidence that would have been caused in the exploitation of new coal seams under built-up areas.

Coal from the mine was fed to the nearby Stuart Street Power Station via an underground conveyor system.

Other industries

The other large employer in Bradford was Richard Johnson & Nephew (Bradford Ironworks), manufacturers of wire of all kinds. The ironworks was close to the Ashton Canal. In 1869, a gasometer was built at the new Bradford Gasworks and this, along with the adjacent colliery, ironworks and cotton mills, was a dominant feature of the landscape.

Governance
Bradford was originally a part of the Salford Hundred in the County Palatine of Lancashire.
Bradford was an independent township of the ancient parish of Manchester, having its own parochial offices under the Manchester churchwardens. In 1841 this changed and the township became a member of the Manchester Poor Law Union, which was established under the Poor Law Amendment Act of 1841. From 13 April 1850 the village was a member of the Prestwich Union, constituted by order of the Poor Law Board in 1850. The Local Board was set up in 1863 under the Public Health Act of 1848. In 1896, Bradford was incorporated into the civil parish of North Manchester.

Under boundary changes by the Local Government Boundary Commission for England (LGBCE) the ward was abolished and replaced with the new electoral wards Ancoats and Beswick and Clayton and Openshaw in May 2018.

 indicates seat up for re-election.
 indicates ward abolished and replaced with new wards: Ancoats & Beswick and Clayton & Openshaw.

Geography
The Bradford township had an area of 288 acres between the River Medlock and Ashton Old Road. During the Industrial Revolution the area was covered with streets of terraced houses. The Ashton Canal crosses the township to the north and beyond the canal is Philips Park. the underlying rocks are the sandstones and shales of the Middle Coal Measures of the Manchester Coalfield.

Regeneration
In addition to the City of Manchester Stadium and National Cycling Centre velodrome, Asda built its then largest store in the UK here, an Asda Supercentre, which opened in June 2002.

Bradford was home to the sculpture B of the Bang, built to commemorate the 2002 Commonwealth Games.  At the time it was the tallest artwork in the UK, but after suffering structural problems was dismantled in 2009.

References

Further reading
Ed Glinert (24 April 2008). The Manchester Compendium: A Street-by-Street History of England's Greatest Industrial City. Penguin Books Limited. pp. 151–53. .

External links

Bradford colliery
Bradford Colliery was a fascinating place 

Areas of Manchester
Manchester City Council Wards